Micael Martins Sequeira (born 6 July 1973) is a Portuguese football manager who manages Lokomotiv Tashkent.

Career

In 2008, Sequeira was appointed manager of Portuguese third division side Arcos de Valdevez after managing the youth academy of Braga in the Portuguese top flight.

In 2009, he was appointed manager of Portuguese second division club Aves.

In 2012, he was appointed manager of Famalicão in the Portuguese third division.

In 2013, Sequeira was appointed manager of Portuguese second division team Trofense. After that, he was appointed manager of Merelinense in the Portuguese fourth division, helping them achieve promotion to the Portuguese third division.

In 2017, he was appointed manager of Portuguese third division outfit Freamunde. After that, Sequeira was appointed youth manager of Al Nassr in Saudi Arabia.

In 2021, he was appointed manager of Uzbekistani side Lokomotiv (Tashkent).

References

External links
 Micael Sequeira at playmakerstats.com
 

1973 births
Living people
Sportspeople from Braga
Portuguese football managers
Portuguese expatriate football managers
Expatriate football managers in Saudi Arabia
Expatriate football managers in Uzbekistan
PFC Lokomotiv Tashkent managers
Portuguese expatriate sportspeople in Saudi Arabia
Uzbekistan Super League managers
Liga Portugal 2 managers
C.D. Aves managers
F.C. Famalicão managers
C.D. Trofense managers
Merelinense F.C. managers
S.C. Freamunde managers